The 1991 Regal Scottish Masters was a professional non-ranking snooker tournament that took place between 11 and 15 September 1991 at the Motherwell Civic Centre in Motherwell, Scotland.

Mike Hallett won the tournament by defeating Steve Davis 10–6 in the final.

Main draw

References

1991
Masters
Scottish Masters
Scottish Masters